John Shafer is a former American college athletics administrator. He served as athletic director at the University of Mississippi from 1998 to 2002, at Eastern Kentucky University from 2003 to 2004, and at Southeast Missouri State University from 2008 to 2011. Shafer attended college at Auburn University, where he played on the school's baseball team. Shafer announced his retirement from collegiate athletic administration on June 16, 2011.

References

Living people
Auburn Tigers baseball coaches
Auburn Tigers baseball players
Ole Miss Rebels athletic directors
Eastern Kentucky Colonels athletic directors
Southeast Missouri State Redhawks athletic directors
Year of birth missing (living people)